Alvah Tindal Sublett (May 11, 1883 – September 23, 1961) was a college football and baseball player.

Early years
Though born in Texas, he grew up in Summerton, South Carolina.

Furman
Sublett was a prominent fullback and punter for the Furman Paladins of Furman University, captain of the 1901 and 1902 teams coached by Charles Roller.

1902
He was selected for the All-Southern team of the Atlanta Constitution in 1902, a season in which Furman defeated South Carolina. Furman also defeated NC State (then North Carolina A & M) that year 5 to 2, "Captain Sublett, of the Furman team, really won the game with sensational kick of goal. Furman's football program was abolished for a decade after 1902.

See also
1902 College Football All-Southern Team

References

1883 births
1961 deaths
Furman Paladins football players
American football fullbacks
All-Southern college football players
Furman Paladins baseball players
Players of American football from South Carolina
People from Clarendon County, South Carolina
American football punters
People from Lockhart, Texas